Miss Europe 1959 was the 22nd edition of the Miss Europe pageant and the 11th edition under the Mondial Events Organization. It was held in Palermo, Sicily, Italy on September 6, 1959. Christl Spazier of Austria, was crowned Miss Europe 1959 by out going titleholder Johanna "Hanni" Ehrenstrasser of Austria. This was the 4th back to back win in the pageant's history.

Results

Placements

Contestants 

 - Christl Spazier
 - Michèle Goethals
 - Nettie Torp
 - Karen MacGill
 - Tarja Nurmi
 - Nicole Périn
 - Carmela Künzel
 - Eleonora "Nora" Apergi
 - Petra Poul (Paul)
 - Margrét Gunnlaugsdóttir
 - Maria Grazia Buccella
 - Josée Pundel
 - Berit Grundvig
 - Monica Nordqvist
 - Figen Özgür

Notes

Returns

Withdrawals

"Comité Officiel et International Miss Europe" Competition

From 1951 to 2002 there was a rival Miss Europe competition organized by the "Comité Officiel et International Miss Europe". This was founded in 1950 by Jean Raibaut in Paris, the headquarters later moved to Marseille. The winners wore different titles like Miss Europe, Miss Europa or Miss Europe International.

This year, the competition took place at Joy-Parc in Meaux, France. There were 12 delegates all from their own countries. At the end, Sophie d'Estrade of France was crowned as Miss Europa 1959. D'Estrade succeeded predecessor Evelyne Ricket of France. This was the first back to back in the history of Miss Europa.

Placements

Contestants

 - Marguerite Nessler
 - Rikkie Kraner
 - Eve Dortant
 D'Outre Mer, France - Liliane Chambertin
 - Sophie d'Estrade
 - Karin Gabor
 - Catherine Tatopoulos
 - Julia Cohen Stuart
 - Marie-Jose Azur
 - Manuela Marquez
 German-speaking Switzerland - Carola Segesser
 Romandy - Yvette Lavanchy

References

External links 
 

Miss Europe
1959 beauty pageants
1959 in Italy
1959 in France